Arnaldo Bologni (born 23 August 1960) is an Italian equestrian. He competed in two events at the 1996 Summer Olympics.

References

External links
 

1960 births
Living people
Italian male equestrians
Olympic equestrians of Italy
Equestrians at the 1996 Summer Olympics
Competitors at the 1993 Mediterranean Games
Competitors at the 1997 Mediterranean Games
Place of birth missing (living people)
Mediterranean Games silver medalists for Italy
Mediterranean Games bronze medalists for Italy
Mediterranean Games medalists in equestrian